Páll Klettskarð (born 17 May 1990) is Faroese footballer who plays as a striker for KÍ and the Faroe Islands national team.

International career
He was called up to the Faroe Islands squad in February 2013 for a training camp held in Thailand and came on as a substitute in a friendly match against the Thailand U23 team.
He made his official debut for the Faroe Islands in a World Cup qualifier against Ireland on 7 June 2013. In March 2023, Klettskarð was called up to the national team for the UEFA Euro 2024 qualifying match against Moldova and the friendly against North Macedonia, his first national team call up since 2018.

Individual awards
 Effodeildin Best Young Player: 2012
 Effodeildin Topscorer: 2012 (along with Clayton Soares)
 Effodeildin Best Forward: 2013

Family
His mother is Óluva Klettskarð, who is a member of the Faroese parliament since 2011 representing Tjóðveldi.

Controversy 

Páll Klettskarð sometimes participates in activities which are normal in the Faroe Islands, i.e. sheep herding and pilot whaling. In July 2016 the Faroese news portal Norðlýsið added photos showing Klettskarð and another football player of KÍ Klaksvík participating in the harvesting of a pod of pilot whales in the bay of Hvannasund. The organisation Sea Shepherd Conservation Society used the information and photos in their campaign in order to end the around 1000 year old whaling tradition in the Faroe Islands, Klettskarð received a lot of Facebook-messages after the incident from people who were upset about the news.

References

External links
 
 
 

1990 births
Living people
Faroese footballers
Association football forwards
Víkingur Gøta players
KÍ Klaksvík players
Faroe Islands international footballers
Faroe Islands youth international footballers